Saeed Ahmed Nazar Muhammad (born 1 February 1990) is a Pakistani international footballer, who plays for Sui Southern Gas as a striker.

He played his first international match in 2012 in the defeat against Singapore.

Career statistics

Club

References

Saeed Ahmed wins best player of the season

Pakistani footballers
Pakistan international footballers
Association football forwards
1990 births
Living people
Muslim FC players
SSGC F.C. players